Damac Football Club is a Saudi Arabian professional sports club based in Khamis Mushait, that currently competes in the Saudi Professional League, the top division of Saudi Arabian football.

Founded in 1972, their home venue is Prince Sultan bin Abdul Aziz Stadium. They are named for the nearby Jabal Damac mountain.

Honours
Saudi First Division
Runners-up (1): 2018–19
Saudi Second Division
Winners (2): 1980–81, 2014–15
Runners-up (2): 1989–90, 2004–05
Saudi Third Division
Runners-up (1): 2002–03

Current squad

Out on loan

Managerial history

 Azzedine Abbas (1981 – 1985)
 Mohsen Habacha (1985 – 1986)
 Mohammed Aldo (2003 – 2006)
 Said El Khider (July 31, 2006 – October 10, 2006)
 Al Hadi Ben Mokhtar (November 13, 2006 – January 30, 2008)
 Selim Al Manga (January 31, 2008 – March 29, 2009)
 Ali Mujahid (July 1, 2009 – January 15, 2010)
 Mohamed Al Maalej (caretaker) (January 15, 2010 – January 27, 2010)
 Jalal Qaderi (January 27, 2010 – May 1, 2010)
 Mondher Ladhari (June 15, 2010 – May 31, 2011)
 Boris Bunjak (July 1, 2011 – October 8, 2011)
 Abdelkader Youmir (November 4, 2011 – March 13, 2012)
 Hassan Ahmed (March 13, 2012 – May 31, 2012)
 Jamal El Din Hamza (July 30, 2012 – November 29, 2012)
 Selim Al Manga (November 29, 2012 – November 23, 2013)
 Zouhair Louati (November 23, 2013 – May 1, 2014)
 Khalil Obaid (June 13, 2014 – December 8, 2014)
 Mohamed Al Maalej (December 8, 2014 – October 25, 2015)
 Mohamed Al Dao (October 25, 2015 – March 15, 2016)
 Selim Al Manga (March 16, 2016 – May 1, 2016)
 Amr Anwar (June 24, 2016 – September 22, 2016)
 Bayrem Mokhtari (caretaker) (September 22, 2016 – October 4, 2016)
 Lotfi Kadri (October 5, 2016 – November 19, 2016)
 Bayrem Mokhtari (November 19, 2016 – February 21, 2017)
 Mladen Frančić (February 21, 2017 – May 22, 2017)
 Kaies Zouaghi (May 31, 2017 – October 5, 2017)
 Mahdi Maiz (caretaker) (October 5, 2017 – October 20, 2017)
 Zouhair Louati (October 20, 2017 – May 1, 2018)
 Mohamed Kouki (May 31, 2018 – October 5, 2019)
 Noureddine Zekri (October 5, 2019 – January 4, 2021)
 Krešimir Režić (January 4, 2021 – March 6, 2023)
 Cosmin Contra (March 6, 2023 – )

External links 

 
 Damac FC at Football Critic
 

Damac FC
Football clubs in Saudi Arabia
Football clubs in Khamis Mushait
Association football clubs established in 1972
1972 establishments in Saudi Arabia